Sidney Schreiber (7 April 1873 – 23 September 1957) was an Australian cricketer. He played in one first-class match for Queensland in 1898/99.

See also
 List of Queensland first-class cricketers

References

External links
 

1873 births
1957 deaths
Australian cricketers
Queensland cricketers
Place of birth missing